Stenocarpus cunninghamii, commonly known as little wheel bush, is a species of flowering plant in the family Proteaceae and is endemic to northern Australia. It is a shrub or small tree with simple, narrow elliptic or lance-shaped adult leaves, groups of pale yellow or white flowers and woody, linear follicles.

Description
Juvenile leaves are elliptic to egg-shaped in outline and lobed or deeply bipinnately-lobed.

Taxonomy
Stenocarpus cunninghamii was first formally described in 1830 by Robert Brown in an addendum to the Supplementum primum Prodromi florae Novae Hollandiae. The specific epithet (cunninghamii) honours the botanical collector Allan Cunningham.

Distribution and habitat
Little wheel bush usually grows in narrow sandstone gorges and in forest and dry scrub from the coast of the Kimberley region in Western Australia to near Wadeye in the Northern Territory and on Cape York Peninsula.

References

Flora of Western Australia
Flora of the Northern Territory
Flora of Queensland
cunninghamii
Plants described in 1830
Taxa named by Robert Brown (botanist, born 1773)